The Johnson Nunataks are two isolated rock crags, or nunataks, which lie  west of Reed Ridge, along the northwest side of Ford Massif in the Thiel Mountains of Antarctica. The name was proposed by Peter Bermel and Arthur B. Ford, co-leaders of the United States Geological Survey (USGS) Thiel Mountains party which surveyed these mountains in 1960–61.

References

Nunataks of Ellsworth Land